

Material Sciences Corporation is an American materials technology company. It began as All Weather Steel Products in Chicago in 1951. It is now headquartered in Canton, Michigan. The company provides engineering and testing solutions for acoustical and coated applications. The company owns five manufacturing plants, in Elk Grove Village, Illinois; East Chicago, Indiana; Walbridge, Ohio; Canfield, Ohio; and Toronto. It has sales offices in Burr Ridge, Illinois, Turin, and Shanghai.

References

External links 

Technology companies established in 1951
Companies formerly listed on the Nasdaq
Companies based in Wayne County, Michigan
1951 establishments in Illinois